Gettin' the Band Back Together is a musical with music and lyrics by Mark Allen and a book by Ken Davenport and the Grundleshotz, a group of performers and writers including Sebastian Arcelus, Fred Berman, Michael Hirstreet, Jenna Coker Jones, Craig Jorczak, Nathan Kaufman, Jay Klaitz, Emily McNamara, Jennifer Miller, Bhavesh Patel, Sarah Saltzberg and Fletcher Young.

Production History

George Street Playhouse, 2013 

Originally titled "Garage Band," Gettin' the Band Back Together was developed through a four-year improvisational rehearsal process by Ken Davenport and the Grundleshotz.  It premiered at the George Street Playhouse on September 24, 2013, starring Alison Fraser and Mitchell Jarvis.  The production was directed by John Rando and choreographed by Kelly Devine. Residents of Sayreville, New Jersey, the musical's setting and Jon Bon Jovi's hometown, were offered half-price tickets to the production's final preview performance on October 3, and first responders and emergency workers from Sayreville were offered complimentary tickets.

Pre-Broadway Workshop, 2014 

On June 24, 2014, Gettin' the Band Back Together had a workshop performance in New York City starring Constantine Maroulis and Marilu Henner and directed by John Rando.

Broadway 2018 
The musical opened on Broadway at the Belasco Theatre on July 19, 2018 in previews with opening night on August 13. The production is directed by Rando with choreography by Chris Bailey, scenic design by Derek McLane, costume design by Emily Rebholz and lighting design by Ken Billington.

The musical closed on September 16, 2018 after 40 performances and 30 previews.

Licensing 
Upon closing of the Broadway run, Broadway Licensing acquired the rights for all future professional and amateur productions.

Plot 

In New York City, businessman Mitch Papadopolous is fired on his fortieth birthday.  He returns to Sayreville, New Jersey, his hometown, to move back in with his mother, Sharon ("Jersey").  Mitch's best friend, Bart, suggests they reunite their old band, Juggernaut, and when Tygen Billows, their nemesis from high school, learns that Mitch has returned to Sayreville, he challenges Mitch to a rematch of the Battle of the Bands competition that Juggernaut won twenty years earlier.

Mitch is initially reluctant to reunite the band ("One of Those Guys"), but when Tygen threatens to foreclose on Sharon's and Bart's houses, Mitch agrees to enter the Battle of the Bands on the condition that if his band wins, Sharon and Bart will get to keep their houses.  Mitch and Bart convince their old band-mates, Sully and Robbie, to get the band back together ("Gettin' the Band Back Together"), with the exception of Kenny, who died while playing a concert at an amusement park two years earlier ("Kenny's Hymn").  The band replaces Kenny with Ricky, a sixteen-year-old student from the local high school where Bart teaches math.

Juggernaut begins rehearsals, encouraged by Sharon, and book their first gig playing a Jewish wedding ("Hava Nagila").  Mitch begins talking to Dani, his ex from high school who is dating Tygen.  Mitch and Tygen get into a fist fight at a bar, landing Juggernaut in jail ("Life Without Parole").

The band gets out of jail just in time for the Battle of the Bands, where Juggernaut performs their new song ("Do Over").

Musical numbers

Act I
"Jersey" - Mitch and Company
"How Does Your Mouthfeel?" - Tygen and Mouthfeel
"One of Those Guys" - Mitch and Company
"Jersey" (Reprise) - Tygen and Mouthfeel
"Gettin' the Band Back Together" - Mitch, Bart, Sully, Robbie and Company
"Find the One" - Robbie, Juggernaut and Company
"Best Day of My Life" - Mitch, Dani and Company
"WWJD" - Sharon, Juggernaut and Company

Act II
"Hava Naglia" - Ricky, Billie and Company
"Second Chances" - Nick
"I Just Want Real" - Dani, Roxanne, Sharon, Tawney and Billie
"Life Without Parole" - Sully and Company
"Battle of Your Life" - Roxanne, Juggernaut, Mouthfeel and Company
"Bart's Confession" - Bart
"Best Band in the World" - Mouthfeel
"One of Those Guys" (Reprise) - Mitch
"Do Over" - Mitch and Company
"Jersey" (Reprise) - Mitch and Company

Original casts

Original cast recordings 

An original cast recording of the George Street Playhouse production of Gettin' the Band Back Together was released on December 27, 2013.

Song List 
 "Jersey" - Mitch, Bart, Sully, Robbie, Ensemble
 "One of Those Guys" - Mitch
 "Gettin' the Band Back Together" - Mitch, Bart, Sully, Robbie
 "Kenny's Hymn" - Mitch, Bart, Sully, Robbie
 "Hava Nagila" - Ricky, Ensemble
 "Life Without Parole" - Mitch, Bart, Sully, Robbie, Ricky, Drunk Guy
 "Bart's Confession" - Bart, Ensemble
 "Do Over" - Mitch, Bart, Sully, Robbie, Ricky

An original Broadway cast recording, produced by Sh-K-Boom Records, was recorded on August 22, 2018 and released on September 28, 2018.

References

External links 
Internet Broadway Database
 

2013 musicals
Original musicals